"The Devil and Daniel Webster" is a 1937 short story by Stephen Vincent Benét.

The Devil and Daniel Webster can also refer to:

The Devil and Daniel Webster (1938 opera), an opera by Douglas Moore
The Devil and Daniel Webster (film), an adaptation of Benet's story, starring Edward Arnold and Walter Huston
The Devil and Daniel Webster (short film), an animated musical comedy short film made by Dominic Fera and released in 2007